Kopaitic Island is an island lying  west of Cape Legoupil in the Duroch Islands, Antarctica. It was named in honor of 1° Lieutenant Boris Kopaitic O'Neill for the first Chilean Antarctic Expedition of 1947. The Commander of the Chilean Expedition at Greenwich Island.

See also 
 List of Antarctic and sub-Antarctic islands
 Captain Arturo Prat Base

References 

Islands of the Duroch Islands